Pechenga may refer to:
Pechenga (river), a river in Murmansk Oblast, Russia
Pechenga Monastery, a historical monastery
Pechenga, Kostroma Oblast, a village in Buysky District of Kostroma Oblast
Pechenga (railway station), Murmansk Oblast, a railway station classified as a rural locality in Pechengsky District of Murmansk Oblast
Pechenga (urban-type settlement), Murmansk Oblast, Pechengsky District, Murmansk Oblast

See also
 Pachanga / Pachanga (disambiguation)
 Pechanga or Pechanga Band of Luiseño Mission Indians
 Pechengsky District
 Petsamo (disambiguation)